Provincial Trunk Highway 10 (PTH 10) is a provincial primary highway located in the Canadian province of Manitoba.

PTH 10 begins at the International Peace Garden along the Canada–United States border near Boissevain. The highway runs north through Brandon, Dauphin, Swan River, and The Pas to the Saskatchewan boundary at Flin Flon.  The speed limit is 100 km/h.

PTH 10 is designated as the John Bracken Highway between the International Peace Garden and Riding Mountain National Park, and the Northern Woods and Water Route between Dauphin and The Pas. The highway also serves as the main route through Riding Mountain National Park.

At  in length, PTH 10 is currently the longest highway in the province.

Route history 
An earlier PTH 10 was designated in 1926 from Winnipeg to Whitemouth. In 1930, it extended east to Ontario. This was eliminated in 1932-1933, as it became part of PTH 1.
PTH 10, in its current state, first appeared on the 1938-39 Manitoba Highway Map. Prior to this, the road appeared in several broken sections with different numbering. Between Minnedosa and Swan River, the highway was known as Highway 6. The highway was designated as Highway 26 between Minnedosa and Brandon, Highway 25 between Brandon and Highway 2, and Highway 20 from Highway 2 to Boissevain. Highway 20 became part of Highway 25 in 1929.

While PTH 10 has largely maintained the same configuration for most of its history, the highway has had a few fairly significant reconfigurations in its time.

Within Brandon, 18th Street between Victoria Avenue and the current junction with PTH 1 was designated as part of PTH 10 in 1962. PTH 1 was reconfigured to its current route in 1959 and included as part of the Trans-Canada Highway system three years later. Prior to this, PTH 10 met PTH 1 (PTH 1A between 1959 and 1962) at the intersection of 18th Street and Victoria Avenue. The intersection with PTH 1/1A was moved to its current location in 1959.

The section of PTH 10 between its current junction with PTH 24/PR 262 at Tremaine and eastbound PTH 16 was constructed and opened to traffic in 1962. PTH 24 (known as Highway 27 prior to 1956) would travel  past its current eastbound terminus to meet PTH 10. The two highways ran in concurrence from this junction through Minnedosa along what is now PTH 16A to its current northbound/westbound junction.

The original section of PTH 10 was redesignated as PR 262 when the provincial government implemented its secondary highway system in 1966.

Prior to 1950, PTH 10's northern terminus was with PTH 83 (then known as Highway 31) at Swan River. The highway was extended to The Pas in 1951, and to its current northern terminus at Flin Flon the following year.

On July 18, 2016, the southernmost section of PTH 10 was designated as the John Bracken Highway in honour of Manitoba's premier between 1922 and 1943.

Major intersections

References

External links 
Official Name and Location - Declaration of Provincial Trunk Highways Regulation - The Highways and Transportation Act - Provincial Government of Manitoba
Official Highway Map - Published and maintained by the Department of Infrastructure - Provincial Government of Manitoba (see Legend and Map#1, 4 & 6)
Google Maps Search - Provincial Trunk Highway 10

010
Northern Woods and Water Route
Dauphin, Manitoba
Flin Flon
Transport in Brandon, Manitoba
Transport in The Pas